Inner Worlds is a 1996 fantasy platform game by Sleepless Software Inc. incorporating some RPG elements. The game is concentrated on a werewolf character called Nikita who travels through a magical world fighting monsters and learning spells.

Gameplay
Although the game appears to be a typical platform game with levels grouped into three episodes, there are many RPG elements, which make the game much more complex. Although episodes must be played in proper order, the level structure of the game is not strictly linear as it is possible to skip some levels and return to them later in the episode. In addition to jumping, running and fighting monsters, Nikita is able to shapeshift into a  wolf at any time, if  she has enough mana, which gives her access to otherwise inaccessible locations. She also can collect many kinds of weapons and other special items such as keys, scrolls and potions. Some of them can give her some special abilities. It is even possible to enchant the weapon chosen by the player to dramatically change its power and behavior.

Character development system
Unlike other games at the time, in Inner Worlds the main character gets stronger through the course of the game in addition to collecting new items and weapons, as would be expected in a role playing game. On almost every level the player is able to find an amulet which increases  maximum mana or health. Killing unusual monsters allows the player to learn some spells to create magical arrows or fireballs.

Story
The story is revealed to the player by long text introductions before each level.  In the first episode Wizard's World, Nikita travels into the Castle Drofanayrb (whose name is the name of programmer Bryan A. Ford spelled backwards) to defeat the powerful monster called Gralob, which was created by a powerful mage and now is the scourge of the land. In the second episode World of Change, she returns to her homeland to discover further horrors – and to fight them. In the third episode Heart of the World, she descends into the large volcano in order to engage in a final confrontation with evil forces.

Music
The music tracks played during the game were written by different people who won a contest held for that purpose on the Internet. The game's creators  offered $100 for all the songs they choose to put in the game, and $1,000 as the first prize for the contest winner. The winner was Daniel Hansson from Sweden for the track called Unplugged. The authors of other songs used in the game were from locations as disparate as Croatia, Netherlands, Slovakia, Australia, US and Finland.

Development, release and reception 
The Sleepless Software team originally consisted of 3 people from Salt Lake City, with Inner Worlds being their first project. The team became much larger using the internet, and in the end consisted of 27 people from 9 countries.
Creating the game took 3 years instead of 1 year originally  planned. In 1996 Inner Worlds was released on DOS and Linux – its first episode Wizard's World was distributed as a shareware. Despite all this, the game was not well purchased, though decently received.

Around 2001 the developers released the game as freely redistributable freeware on their website.

References

External links

Official website

Linux version at Internet Archive
DOS version at Internet Archive

1996 video games
DOS games
Linux games
Freeware games
Video games developed in the United States
Video games featuring female protagonists